Arthur Morton may refer to:

Arthur Morton (American football) (1914–1999), American football coach
Arthur Morton (footballer) (1925–2011), English former professional footballer
Arthur Morton (cricketer, born 1882) (1882–1970), English cricketer
Arthur Morton (cricketer, born 1883) (1883–1935), English cricketer
Arthur Henry Aylmer Morton (1836–1913), British Conservative politician, MP for Deptford
A. L. Morton (1903–1987), English Marxist historian
Arthur Silver Morton (1870–1945), Canadian historian, archivist and academic